Jones v Lipman [1962] 1 WLR 832 is a UK company law case concerning piercing the corporate veil. It exemplifies the principal case in which the veil will be lifted, that is, when a company is used as a "mere facade" concealing the "true facts", which essentially means it is formed to avoid a pre-existing obligation.

Facts
Mr Lipman contracted to sell a house at 3 Fairlawn Avenue, Chiswick, Middlesex (now Ealing W4), to Mr Jones for £5,250. He changed his mind and refused to complete. To try to avoid a specific performance order, he conveyed it to a company formed for that purpose alone, which he alone owned and controlled.

Judgment
Russell J ordered specific performance against Mr Lipman and formed company.

See also

UK company law

Notes

References

United Kingdom company case law
United Kingdom corporate personality case law
High Court of Justice cases
1962 in case law
1962 in British law